The 2017 Aceh World Solidarity Tsunami Cup was a four-team association football youth tournament held at the 45,000-seat Harapan Bangsa Stadium in the Indonesian city of Banda Aceh between the 2 and 6 December 2017. The tournament was organized as a show of solidarity for the areas affected by the 2004 Indian Ocean earthquake and tsunami and to bring major entertainment events back to the city. Originally many teams were invited to participate, particularly those nations affected by the tsunami. Turkey and Australia were expected to participate but were not part of the final lineup. Tournament organizers would like to make the Aceh World Solidarity Tsunami Cup a yearly event. The tournament followed the same rules as football at the Summer Olympics, with the nations' under-23 teams competing with a maximum of three overage players on each roster.

Participating nations
 (Host)

Venues

Standings

Matches

Awards

Prizes
Winner: $50,000 USD
Runner-up: $25,000 USD
Fair Play Award: $5,000 USD
Best Player: $2,500 USD
Top Scorer: $2,500 USD

Source:

Goalscorers
3 goals
 Anton Zemlianukhin

2 goals
 Azamat Baymatov
 Kadybrek Saarbekov
 Mönkh-Erdengiin Tögöldör

1 goal
 Fachrudin Aryanto
 Gavin Kwan Adsit
 Hansamu Yama
 Ilija Spasojević
 Osvaldo Haay
 Septian David
 Yabes Roni
 Saliev Askarbek

References

External links
Official website

2017 in Indonesian football
International association football competitions hosted by Indonesia
Banda Aceh
Aceh World Solidarity Tsunami